In Euclidean geometry, a bicentric quadrilateral is a convex quadrilateral that has both an incircle and a circumcircle. The radii and center of these circles are called inradius and circumradius, and incenter and circumcenter respectively. From the definition it follows that bicentric quadrilaterals have all the properties of both tangential quadrilaterals and cyclic quadrilaterals. Other names for these quadrilaterals are chord-tangent quadrilateral and inscribed and circumscribed quadrilateral. It has also rarely been called a double circle quadrilateral and double scribed quadrilateral.

If two circles, one within the other, are the incircle and the circumcircle of a bicentric quadrilateral, then every point on the circumcircle is the vertex of a bicentric quadrilateral having the same incircle and circumcircle. This is a special case of Poncelet's porism, which was proved by the French mathematician Jean-Victor Poncelet (1788–1867).

Special cases 

Examples of bicentric quadrilaterals are squares, right kites, and isosceles tangential trapezoids.

Characterizations 

A convex quadrilateral  with sides  is bicentric if and only if opposite sides satisfy Pitot's theorem for tangential quadrilaterals and  the cyclic quadrilateral property that opposite angles are supplementary; that is,

Three other characterizations concern the points where the incircle in a tangential quadrilateral is tangent to the sides. If the incircle is tangent to the sides  at  respectively, then a tangential quadrilateral  is also cyclic if and only if any one of the following three conditions holds:
 is perpendicular to 

The first of these three means that the contact quadrilateral  is an orthodiagonal quadrilateral.

If  are the midpoints of  respectively, then the tangential quadrilateral  is also cyclic if and only if the quadrilateral  is a rectangle.

Yet another necessary and sufficient condition is that a tangential quadrilateral  is cyclic if and only if its Newton line is perpendicular to the Newton line of its contact quadrilateral . (The Newton line of a quadrilateral is the line defined by the midpoints of its diagonals.)

Construction 

There is a simple method for constructing a bicentric quadrilateral:

At the endpoints of the chords draw the tangents  to the incircle. These intersect at four points , which are the vertices of a bicentric quadrilateral.
To draw the circumcircle, draw two perpendicular bisectors  on the sides of the bicentric quadrilateral  respectively . The perpendicular bisectors  intersect in the centre  of the circumcircle  with the distance  to the centre  of the incircle . The circumcircle can be drawn around the centre .

The validity of this construction is due to the characterization that, in a tangential quadrilateral , the contact quadrilateral  has perpendicular diagonals if and only if the tangential quadrilateral is also cyclic.

Area

Formulas in terms of four quantities 
The area  of a bicentric quadrilateral can be expressed in terms of four quantities of the quadrilateral in several different ways.

This is a special case of Brahmagupta's formula. It can also be derived directly from the trigonometric formula for the area of a tangential quadrilateral. Note that the converse does not hold: Some quadrilaterals that are not bicentric also have area  One example of such a quadrilateral is a non-square rectangle.

The area can also be expressed in terms of the tangent lengths  as

A formula for the area of bicentric quadrilateral  with incenter  is

If a bicentric quadrilateral has tangency chords  and diagonals , then it has area

This formula cannot be used if the quadrilateral is a right kite, since the denominator is zero in that case.

where  is the center of the incircle.

Formulas in terms of three quantities 
The area of a bicentric quadrilateral can be expressed in terms of two opposite sides and the angle  between the diagonals according to

In terms of two adjacent angles and the radius  of the incircle, the area is given by

The area is given in terms of the circumradius  and the inradius  as

where  is either angle between the diagonals.

where  is the foot of the perpendicular to the line  through the center of the incircle.

Inequalities 

There is equality on either side only if the quadrilateral is a square.

Another inequality for the area is

A similar inequality giving a sharper upper bound for the area than the previous one is

with equality holding if and only if the quadrilateral is a right kite.

In addition, with sides  and semiperimeter :

Angle formulas 
If  are the length of the sides  respectively in a bicentric quadrilateral , then its vertex angles can be calculated with the tangent function:

Using the same notations, for the sine and cosine functions the following formulas holds:

The angle  between the diagonals can be calculated from

Inradius and circumradius 
The inradius  of a bicentric quadrilateral is determined by the sides  according to

The circumradius  is given as a special case of Parameshvara's formula. It is

The inradius can also be expressed in terms of the consecutive tangent lengths  according to

These two formulas are in fact necessary and sufficient conditions for a tangential quadrilateral with inradius  to be cyclic.

The four sides  of a bicentric quadrilateral are the four solutions of the quartic equation

A bicentric quadrilateral has a greater inradius than does any other tangential quadrilateral having the same sequence of side lengths.

Inequalities 
The circumradius  and the inradius  satisfy the inequality

which was proved by L. Fejes Tóth in 1948. It holds with equality only when the two circles are concentric (have the same center as each other); then the quadrilateral is a square. The inequality can be proved in several different ways, one using the double inequality for the area above.

An extension of the previous inequality is

where there is equality on either side if and only if the quadrilateral is a square.

The semiperimeter  of a bicentric quadrilateral  satisfies

Moreover,

and

Distance between the incenter and circumcenter

Fuss' theorem 
Fuss' theorem gives a relation between the inradius , the circumradius  and the distance  between the incenter  and the circumcenter , for any bicentric quadrilateral. The relation is

or equivalently

It was derived by Nicolaus Fuss (1755–1826) in 1792. Solving for  yields

Fuss's theorem, which is the analog of Euler's theorem for triangles for bicentric quadrilaterals, says that if a quadrilateral is bicentric, then its two associated circles are related according to the above equations.

Carlitz' identity 
Another formula for the distance  between the centers of the incircle and the circumcircle is due to the American mathematician Leonard Carlitz (1907–1999). It states that

where  are the sides of the bicentric quadrilateral.

Inequalities for the tangent lengths and sides 
For the tangent lengths   the following inequalities holds:

and

The sides  satisfy the inequalities

and

Other properties of the incenter 
The circumcenter, the incenter, and the intersection of the diagonals in a bicentric quadrilateral are collinear.

There is the following equality relating the four distances between the incenter  and the vertices of a bicentric quadrilateral :

where  is the inradius.

If  is the intersection of the diagonals in a bicentric quadrilateral  with incenter , then

An inequality concerning the inradius  and circumradius  in a bicentric quadrilateral  is

where  is the incenter.

Properties of the diagonals 
The lengths of the diagonals in a bicentric quadrilateral can be expressed in terms of the sides or the tangent lengths, which are formulas that holds in a cyclic quadrilateral and a tangential quadrilateral respectively.

In a bicentric quadrilateral with diagonals , the following identity holds:

This equality can be rewritten as

or, solving it as a quadratic equation for the product of the diagonals, in the form

An inequality for the product of the diagonals  in a bicentric quadrilateral is

where  are the sides. This was proved by Murray S. Klamkin in 1967.

Four incenters lie on a circle

Let  be a bicentric quadrilateral and  the center of its circumcircle. Then the incenters of the four triangles  lie on a circle.

See also 

Bicentric polygon
Ex-tangential quadrilateral

References 

Types of quadrilaterals